Minuscule 773 (in the Gregory-Aland numbering), A14 (von Soden), is a Greek minuscule manuscript of the New Testament written on parchment. Palaeographically it has been assigned to the 10th century. The manuscript has no complex contents. Scrivener labelled it as 868e.

Description 
The codex contains the text of the four Gospels, on 285 parchment leaves (size ), with some lacunae. It lacks the text of Matthew 1:1-5:46. The text is written in one column per page, 15 lines per page (biblical text), and 57 lines per page (commentary's text). It has a commentary; several Isagogae from Eusebius, Isidor, Hesychius, Methodius, Cosmas, John of Damascus, Cyril of Alexandria.

There is also another division according to the smaller Ammonian Sections (in Mark 235 Sections, the last in 16:12), with references to the Eusebian Canons (written below Ammonian Section numbers).

The text of the Gospels and of commentary were corrected by a later hand.

Text 
The Greek text of the codex is a representative of the Byzantine text-type. Aland placed it in Category V.

The manuscript was not examined by using the Claremont Profile Method.

The lacks the Pericope Adulterae (John 7:53-8:11).

History 
F. H. A. Scrivener dated the manuscript to the 10th century; C. R. Gregory dated the manuscript to the 11th century. The manuscript is currently dated by the INTF to the 10th century.

The manuscript was written by John, a monk. It was housed in the monastery church του Σκουτρη.

The manuscript was noticed in a catalogue from 1876.

It was added to the list of New Testament manuscripts by Scrivener (868) and Gregory (773). Gregory saw the manuscript in 1886. It was examined by Ernst von Dobschütz.

The manuscript is now housed at the National Library of Greece (56) in Athens.

See also 

 List of New Testament minuscules
 Biblical manuscript
 Textual criticism
 Minuscule 772

References

Further reading 

 

Greek New Testament minuscules
10th-century biblical manuscripts
Manuscripts of the National Library of Greece